CINE (Council on International Nontheatrical Events) was a non-profit film organization based in Washington, D.C.  Founded in 1957 with the mission of selecting American films for international film festivals, CINE's focus evolved to supporting emerging and established producers of film, TV and digital media from all around the world through film competitions, educational panels, screenings and networking opportunities. After 61 years, CINE ceased operations in 2018.

History
CINE's original name, the Committee on International Non-Theatrical Events, was chosen to create the acronym CINE, after which it was then changed to Council on International Non-Theatrical Events. Over time the organization came to refer to itself primarily as CINE.

CINE's original purpose was to provide European film festival directors with representative American informational films to exhibit. For decades, the CINE Golden Eagle Competition was a way for non-theatrical American films to gain access to festivals and even the Academy Awards before they stopped accepting entries from the majority of festivals and competitions.

CINE was once partially funded by the now defunct United States Information Agency. This funding ceased in the late 1990s, not long before the abolishment of the agency.

In the fall of 2014 CINE made some major changes to their organization, which included creating one entry cycle per year for each award (Professional, Independent and Student), switching to a more traditional nominee structure in which only one production per category is named the winner, and transitioning the entire process online. However, unlike many major awards organizations, CINE's categories were based on content, not distribution platform, to reflect the constantly changing industry.

Awards
CINE presents two types of awards: competitive and honorary. Competitive awards include the Golden Eagle Award (instituted in 1962), Special Jury Award, Masters Series, and Award of Excellence. Honorary awards included the Leadership Award, Trailblazer Award, Lifetime Achievement Award, and Legends Award. Separate from the Golden Eagle Awards, CINE also held a Film Scoring Competition, which was launched in 2013. In 2014, the competition was renamed the Marvin Hamlisch Film Contest for Emerging Composers in honor of the legendary composer. In 2019, after CINE had shut down, the Marvin Hamlisch estate launched the Marvin Hamlisch International Music Awards non-profit to continue holding composition competitions under the composer's name, expanding the scope of the contests to include theater, classical and song categories in multiple genres.

CINE utilizes a jury system to select winners. CINE also presents individuals with special honors. Many important filmmakers have received the Golden Eagle Award early in their career, such as Steven Spielberg for his first film Amblin', Mel Brooks for his first short film The Critic, and Ken Burns for his student film Brooklyn Bridge.

The CINE award trophies were made by New York firm, Society Awards.

Notable CINE Golden Eagle winners 

The following people in the film and television industry are among those who have received a CINE Golden Eagle: 
 Robert Altman (The Real McTeague, 1994) 
 Darrell Beschen(Running on Empty, 1978)
 Mel Brooks (The Critic, 1963)
 Ken Burns (Brooklyn Bridge, 1981) 
 Billy Crystal (61*, 2001) 
 Robert De Niro (Holiday Heart, 2001) 
 Robert Drew (Who's Out There?, 1975)
 Dick Ebersol (The Ancient Games, 1973) 
 Steven Thomas Fischer (Freedom Dance, 2007)
 Abby Ginzberg (Soul of Justice: Thelton Henderson's American Journey, 2006) 
 Taylor Hackford (Bukowski, 1974)
 Jim Henson (Time Piece, 1967) 
 Ron Howard (Deed of Daring-Do, 1972) 
Barbara Koppel (1990 - American Dream ;  1994 - A Century of Women ; 2005 -Bearing Witness ) 
 John Lasseter and Pixar (Luxo Jr., 1987) 
 Spike Lee (4 Little Girls, 1998) 
 Barry Levinson (Displaced Persons, 1985) 
 Bill Lichtenstein (West 47th Street 2004)
 Jane Lubchenco (Diversity of Life, 1994) 
 Albert Magnoli (Jazz, 1979) 
 Paul McCartney (McCartney in St. Petersburg, 2006) 
 Anisa Mehdi (Muslims, 2002) 
 Mira Nair (So Far From India, 1983) 
 Mike Nichols (Bach to Bach, 1968)
 Sydney Pollack (Sketches of Frank Gehry, 2007) 
 Fred Rogers (Let's Talk About Going to the Doctor, 1986) 
 Martin Scorsese (No Direction Home, 2006) 
 Steven Spielberg (Amblin', 1969) 
 Julie Taymor (Oedipus Rex, 1993) 
 Forest Whitaker (Brick City, 2010)
 Robert Zemeckis (The Lift, 1972)  Edward Zwick and Marshall Herskovitz (Special Bulletin, ''1984)

References

External links
 CINE winners 1982-2007
 CINE Golden Eagle winners, Spring 2008 to Spring 2012
 CINE Golden Eagle winners, Fall 2012
 CINE Golden Eagle winners, Spring 2013
 CINE Golden Eagle winners, Fall 2013
 CINE winners 2015

American film awards
1957 establishments in the United States